Maarten Herman van Emden (December 31, 1937 – January 4, 2023) was a Dutch-Canadian mathematician and computer scientist whose research in the foundations of logic programming and constraint logic programming was highly influential.

Early Years
Van Emden was born in Velp, the Netherlands, and his early childhood was spent mostly in the Dutch East Indies. He did his national military service in 1959–1960, serving as pilot and commissioned officer. He attended national flight training school and worked for KLM as a pilot from 1960 to 1963.

Education
Van Emden completed an MSc from the Delft University of Technology in 1966 and a PhD in computer science from the University of Amsterdam in 1971. His dissertation, titled “An Analysis of Complexity" was in Information theory and Data analysis. His thesis supervisor was Adriaan van Wijngaarden, who also supervised another notable Dutch computer scientist Edsger W. Dijkstra.

Career
Van Emden spent 1971 to 1972 as a postdoctoral fellow at the IBM Thomas J. Watson Research Center  and then joined the Machine Intelligence group at the University of Edinburgh as a research fellow under Donald Michie.  In 1975, he immigrated into Canada to join the faculty at the University of Waterloo. He moved to the University of Victoria in 1987. His visiting fellow positions include University of Edinburgh in 1980, Imperial College (UK) in 1982–1983, and NWO (Netherlands) in 2000–2001.

In collaboration with Robert Kowalski, van Emden developed the fixpoint semantics of Horn clauses, which underpin the logical semantics of logic programming. He further researched on software verification and correctness, and constraint satisfaction, along with interval arithmetic and interval propagation
. He wrote an advice-taking Prolog program for certain chess endgames.

Between 2008 and 2016 van Emden wrote a collection of essays on the practice of programming and the history and philosophy of computing on a blog entitled A Programmer's Place.

References

1937 births
2023 deaths
Computer science educators
Computer science writers
Dutch computer scientists
Dutch computer programmers
Dutch software engineers
Dutch systems scientists
Canadian computer scientists
Canadian computer programmers
Canadian software engineers
Dutch technology writers
Canadian essayists
Formal methods people
Logic programming researchers
Programming language researchers
Theoretical computer scientists
20th-century Dutch mathematicians
20th-century essayists